William Martin Aucoin (December 29, 1943 – June 28, 2010) was an American band manager, well known for his work with the rock band Kiss and Billy Idol.

Biography

Born in 1943 in Ayer, Massachusetts, Aucoin attended Northeastern University and graduated with a degree in film. He worked at WGBH in Boston during his college years and after. Aucoin later worked at Teletape Productions as a cinematographer. Credited with discovering Kiss, Aucoin managed the group for nearly a decade. He was fired in 1982 due to a dispute about the band's appearance plus his drug abuse, but later worked with the band on various DVD projects.

Aucoin produced a television show called Supermarket Sweep in the early 1970s. From 2005 to 2007, Aucoin went into the Broadway business with a staging of The Who's Quadrophenia, which showed intermittently for two years in Anaheim and Los Angeles.

Aucoin had reentered the management business with his company Aucoin Globe Entertainment, at the time of his death of surgical complications from prostate cancer. He was survived by partner Roman Fernandez and sisters Betty Britton and Janet Bankowski. A statement from Paul Stanley and Gene Simmons described him as "our irreplaceable original manager, mentor and dear friend… Words cannot convey his impact on us or those close to him."

List of acts managed

 Kiss, 1973–1982
 Piper 1975–1978
Virgin 1977-1979
 New England 1978–1981
 Spider, 1979-1981
 Manowar, 1981
 Kid Rocker, 1981–1983
 Toby Beau, 1978-1980
 Skatt Bros. 1979-1981
 Shawn Sommers 1984
 Gen X 1980-1981
 Billy Idol, 1981–1986
 Endgames, 1983-1985
 Brunette, 1988–1989
 Rising Star, 1989–1990
 Sic Vikki, 1990-1992
 Flipp, 1998–2003
 CREATURE - 1998-2002
 Starz, 1977–1979
 vanSolo, 2007–2008      
 Crossbreed, 2003–2010
 Lordi, 2006–2010
 Nothing Rhymes with Orange, 2007–2010
 Evan Saffer, 2007–2010
 NAKED 2009–2010
 BEX, 2010
 The Early Strike, 2010
 Tantric, 2010
 RoqueZa, 1998–2001
 Dreaming in Stereo, 2010

References

External links
 

1943 births
2010 deaths
Kiss (band) personnel
LGBT people from Massachusetts
Northeastern University alumni
People from Ayer, Massachusetts
Deaths from prostate cancer
Talent agents
American music managers
American LGBT businesspeople
Deaths from cancer in Florida